John Wayne Olsen, AO (born 7 June 1945) is a former Australian politician, diplomat and football commissioner. He was Premier of South Australia between 28 November 1996 and 22 October 2001. He is now President of the Federal Liberal Party, Chairman of the Australian American Association, Chairman of the Adelaide Football Club and Deputy Chairman of the Adelaide Oval Stadium Management Authority.

Olsen was twice the parliamentary leader of the South Australian Division of the Liberal Party of Australia in the South Australian House of Assembly, from 1982 to 1990 and again from 1996 to 2001. He unsuccessfully led the party to both the 1985 election and 1989 election. After the 1989 election he left South Australian parliament to fill a casual vacancy in the Australian Senate. He returned to the South Australian parliament in 1992, but was defeated for the Liberal party leadership by Dean Brown.

However, in 1996, Olsen successfully challenged Brown for the Liberal leadership, and hence became Premier. He led the party to a narrow victory at the 1997 election, and remained Premier until 2001. He was resigned in 2001, after he was found to have misled parliament during the Motorola affair. Olsen is the longest-serving Liberal Party of Australia Premier of South Australia and the fourth-longest-serving Leader of the Opposition.

After politics Olsen worked as a diplomat and political lobbyist. He became the State President of the South Australian Liberal Party in June 2017. He previously held that position from 1976 to 1979. He was appointed an Officer of the Order of Australia in January 2007.

Early life
Olsen was born on 7 June 1945 in Kadina, South Australia, the son of Joyce Rosalind (née Heath) and Stanley John Olsen, and the nephew of  South Australian Politician Leslie Heath. When he was 18, his father suffered a fatal heart attack while driving the family speedboat. He attended Kadina Memorial High School, later completing a certificate in business studies at the University of Adelaide and becoming a fellow of the National Institute of Accountants.

Olsen began his working career in 1962 as a clerk with the Savings Bank of South Australia. He later became managing director of the family business J. R. Olsen & Sons Pty Ltd, a car and machinery dealer. He served as president of the Federation of Chambers of Commerce of South Australia from 1974 to 1976.

Political career
Olsen was elected to the Kadina Town Council in 1971. He served as mayor from 1974 to 1977, reputedly "South Australia's youngest ever mayor". He was the final mayor before the town was merged into the District Council of Kadina.

In 1976, Olsen was elected president of the Liberal Party of Australia (South Australian Division), serving until 1979. He was first elected to the South Australian House of Assembly at the 1979 election as a Liberal in the Barossa Valley seat of Rocky River. He represented this seat, renamed Custance at the 1985 election, until 1990.

Olsen's political career was marked by a bitter rivalry with Dean Brown, the two representing the conservative and moderate wings of the South Australian Liberal Party respectively. After the 1982 election and the electoral defeat and retirement of David Tonkin, Olsen defeated Brown for the state Liberal Party leadership and became Leader of the Opposition. Up against the Labor premier John Bannon, Olsen lost both the 1985 election and 1989 election. In the latter election, the Liberals won a majority of the two-party vote (52 percent) with a five-seat swing. However, most of that majority was wasted on landslides in the Liberals' rural heartland. Even with the likely support of the one National Party MP, the Liberals were still one seat short of making Olsen Premier.

Olsen resigned as state Liberal leader soon after the election and returned to the backbench. He was appointed to the Australian Senate in 1990 to fill a casual vacancy caused by the resignation of Tony Messner.

However, in 1992, after less than two years in the Senate, he resigned to return to state politics. The Bannon government was under pressure from the collapse of the State Bank of South Australia. However, Olsen's successor as state Liberal leader, Dale Baker, was unable to gain significant ground. Baker resigned as state Liberal leader in 1992 and called a spill for all leadership positions, intending to hand the leadership back to Olsen as soon as he was securely back in the legislature. To facilitate this, former Deputy Premier Roger Goldsworthy, a leading member of the Liberals' right wing, resigned his seat of Kavel, based on Mount Barker, and handed it to Olsen. However, several members of the party's moderate wing were unwilling to see Olsen take the leadership uncontested. They arranged for leading party moderate Ted Chapman to give up his seat of Alexandra and hand it to Brown so Brown could challenge for the leadership. Olsen returned to the House of Assembly at the 1992 Kavel by-election, on the same day as Brown at the 1992 Alexandra by-election. This time, Brown narrowly defeated Olsen in the leadership ballot, and thus became premier when the Liberals won the 1993 election in a landslide where the Liberals won 37 of the 47 seats available, the most that any party has won since the abolition of the Playmander.  Olsen became Minister for Industry and Minister for Infrastructure until 1997, when a cabinet reshuffle saw him become Minister for Information Technology and Minister for Multicultural and Ethnic Affairs.

Soon after taking office, Olsen led negotiations with Motorola to build a software centre in Adelaide. Motorola decided to open the centre in April after winning a number of incentives, including becoming the supplier for a government radio network, and a contract was signed in June. During a September Question Time, Olsen stated that there had been no discussions with Motorola about the radio contract. This statement would ultimately prove to be his undoing.

Premier
By late 1996, however, the Liberals' poll numbers under Brown were stagnating in the face of factional battles and concerns about the slow pace of reform. With a statutory general election due in 1997, two prominent Liberal moderate backbenchers, Joan Hall (wife of former Premier Steele Hall) and Graham Ingerson (who had briefly served as Brown's deputy in Opposition), threw their support to Olsen. With Hall and Ingerson's support, Olsen challenged Brown for the party leadership in November 1996. This time, he succeeded and was sworn in as Premier, with Ingerson as his deputy.

During the ensuing 1997 election campaign, most commentators agreed that Olsen lost the leaders' debate against Labor's Mike Rann. The election was extremely close; on election night many Liberals feared that Labor had managed the 12-seat swing it needed to take back government (Labor had taken two Liberal seats at by-elections). Ultimately, the Liberals suffered a 9.4% swing and lost 11 seats, one short of making Rann Premier. Olsen was forced into a minority government supported by National and independent MPs. It was the first time that the main non-Labor party in South Australia had won a second term since adopting the Liberal Party label in 1974. After one of those crossbenchers, former Liberal Mitch Williams, returned to the party in December 1999, Olsen held a one-seat majority for eight months until he expelled longtime Liberal maverick Peter Lewis in July 2000.

Policies
Among a number of controversial policies, Olsen's government undertook the privatisation of the state-owned electricity industry (ETSA), partly to improve the government's parlous financial situation due to the State Bank disaster and partly in response to the introduction of the Australian National Electricity Market, despite promising not to do so at the 1997 election. The fiscal arguments for privatisation were vigorously criticised by a number of economists. Sharp increases in the retail price of electricity, a consequence of the working of the National Electricity Market, contributed to the growing unpopularity of the government.
The management of the state's water supply was privatised in 1996 with a $1.5bn 15-year contract being awarded to United Water, a subsidiary of Veolia.

Olsen steered water management and conservation projects, including the recycling of water from Adelaide's Bolivar Water Treatment Plant to the Northern Adelaide Plains. He also endorsed and facilitated the Barossa Water Project, a water distribution scheme from the River Murray to the Barossa Valley floor, alleviating the Barossa Valley winegrowers' water irrigation problems and boosting annual production by $30 million.

While in office, he negotiated a $850 million ‘smart-city' redevelopment of Adelaide's northern suburban area (Mawson Lakes) and facilitated the contract negotiations and construction of the Adelaide-Darwin Rail line.

The Olsen Government also secured major sporting events including the Tour Down Under and V8 Supercar Series. The Tour Down Under has become an economic plus for South Australia generating almost 40,000 visitors and $50million in economic benefit during the annual 5 day event. The V8 Supercar series attracts more than 270,000 attendees most years

He pursued a vigorous program of economic reform through the corporatisation and privatisation of government services which included the single largest public outsourcing project of its kind at the time in the world – the outsourcing of the State's water industry, a contract which included the establishment of a private sector water industry.

Resignation

In 1998, an inquiry was established into the process of bringing the technology company Motorola to South Australia. The first report prepared by former chief magistrate Jim Cramond cleared Olsen of any wrongdoing. A second report prepared by Dean Clayton, QC, found Olsen had misled parliament, and also found that Olsen had made representations to Cramond that were labelled "misleading and inaccurate", "dishonest" and had "no factual basis".

Olsen denied any wrongdoing, saying "...I absolutely refute Mr Clayton's assertion. The report clearly indicates there are no criminal activities, no illegal activities."  Nonetheless, amid speculation that he would face a leadership challenge, he resigned as Premier on 10 October 2001. He did not stand for re-election in 2002.

Following the Clayton report, the matter was referred to the then Director of Public Prosecutions, the late Paul Rofe, QC. The Director of Public Prosecutions found no illegal activity and disagreed with some of the findings from the Clayton report. Olsen claimed he was vindicated, noting that two out of three reports had cleared him of any wrongdoing. In 2018 Olsen stated that "I note that the standard I applied to myself at the time seems to have disappeared from modern politics.”

Liberal Party presidency

On 24 May 2017 Olsen announced that he had been asked to stand for the position of State President of the SA Liberals at a party vote on 16 June with cross-factional support, after incumbent Steve Murray stood down from the position on 23 May to contest Davenport at the 2018 state election. Olsen was successful. He had previously served as state president in 1979, before giving up the post to enter parliament. Olsen stepped down from this role in September 2020. Prior to becoming Liberal Party President, Olsen was a registered political lobbyist and had worked with Bespoke Approach as a Special Advisor.

In 2020, Olsen was elected President of the Federal Liberal Party. He was elected unopposed with the support of Prime Minister Scott Morrison.

Consul-General in Los Angeles & New York

Since leaving South Australian politics, Olsen was appointed by the Howard federal Liberal government as Australian Consul-General to Los Angeles. On 7 December 2005, his Liberal Party colleague and fellow South Australian, Australian Foreign Minister, Alexander Downer announced that Olsen would become the new Australian Consul-General in New York.

Olsen started G’Day USA in 2004, a week-long program showcasing the best of Australia. The program expanded to New York in 2007 and has become the largest annual foreign country promotion in the United States.

Football administration
Olsen was appointed chairman of the South Australian Football Commission in 2010. He played a role in the negotiations to move football from Football Park to Adelaide Oval. He served as president of the South Australian National Football League (SANFL) from 2014 to 2020. He is a life member of the West Adelaide Football Club with whom he was the number-one ticket holder for 17 years.

Olsen is presently the Deputy Chairman of the Adelaide Oval Stadium Management Authority.

On 13 October 2020 Olsen was announced as the Chairman of the board of directors of the Adelaide Football Club, one of two Adelaide-based professional Australian rules football clubs participating in the Australian Football League (AFL).

Personal life
Olsen married Julie Abbott in 1968, with whom he had two sons and a daughter.

References

External links
Diplomatic Appointment of John Olsen to Australian Consul-General in New York .

|-

|-

|-

|-

|-

                   

1945 births
Living people
Premiers of South Australia
Liberal Party of Australia members of the Parliament of Australia
Members of the Australian Senate
Members of the Australian Senate for South Australia
Members of the South Australian House of Assembly
Australian people of Scandinavian descent
Officers of the Order of Australia
Delegates to the Australian Constitutional Convention 1998
20th-century Australian politicians
Liberal Party of Australia members of the Parliament of South Australia
Leaders of the Opposition in South Australia
Australian lobbyists
21st-century Australian politicians
Mayors of places in South Australia
Consuls-General of Australia in Los Angeles
Consuls-General of Australia in New York